Broccoli is a vegetable.

Broccoli may also refer to:
 Broccoli (company), a Japanese media company
 Albert R. Broccoli (1909–1996), producer of the James Bond film series
 Barbara Broccoli (born 1960), Albert R. Broccoli's daughter
 Annie Brocoli (born 1971), name of a popular children's character in Québec
 "Broccoli", a song by McFly from the album Room on the 3rd Floor
 a nickname used for Star Trek character Reginald Barclay
 Broccoli, a client-side asset builder written in JavaScript and Node.js
 primarily US slang for Cannabis as used in:
 "Broccoli", a song by American rapper DRAM featuring Lil Yachty
 Broccoli (magazine), a cannabis lifestyle magazine

See also 
 Brockley (disambiguation)